Raymond Jamois (13 June 1901 – 22 March 1983) was a French sprinter. He competed in the men's 400 metres at the 1924 Summer Olympics.

References

External links
 

1901 births
1983 deaths
Athletes (track and field) at the 1924 Summer Olympics
French male sprinters
Olympic athletes of France
Place of birth missing
20th-century French people